Restraining Order is a 1999 crime thriller film directed by Lee H. Katzin and starring Eric Roberts and Hannes Jaenicke.

Plot

Mafia was persecuting a lawyer.

Cast
Eric Roberts as Robert Woodfield
Hannes Jaenicke as Martin Ritter
Tatjana Patitz as Leight Woodfield
Dean Stockwell as Charlie Mason
Franc Luz as Craig Dixon
Sibel Ergener as Joan

References

External links

1999 films
1999 crime thriller films
1999 independent films
American crime thriller films
American independent films
Films directed by Lee H. Katzin
1990s English-language films
1990s American films